Paradise Discotheque is the fourth studio album by Crime & the City Solution, released on September 3, 1990 through Mute Records.

Accolades

Track listing

Personnel 
Crime & the City Solution
Bronwyn Adams – violin
Simon Bonney – vocals
Chrislo Haas – guitar, synthesizer, production
Alexander Hacke – guitar, illustrations
Mick Harvey – drums, piano
Thomas Stern – bass guitar
Production and additional personnel
Bruno Gebhard – recording
Gareth Jones – engineering, recording
Ingo Krauss – recording

References

External links 
 

1990 albums
Crime & the City Solution albums
Mute Records albums